"I Won't Let Go" is a song written by Steve Robson and Jason Sellers and recorded by American country music group Rascal Flatts. It was released in January 2011 as the second single from the band's seventh studio album, Nothing Like This as well as their 28th single overall. The song received positive reviews from critics who praised Gary LeVox's vocal delivery. "I Won't Let Go" peaked at number 2 on the Billboard Hot Country Songs chart, number one on the Canadian country charts and number 31 on the Hot 100. The song was certified Platinum by the Recording Industry Association of America (RIAA), denoting sales of over one million units in the country. It also managed to chart in Australia and Canada, peaking at numbers 39 and 68 respectively. The accompanying music video for the song was directed by Deaton-Flanigen Productions and is footage of a live performance.

Content and writing
Jason Sellers and Steve Robson wrote the song together. Robson had begun the song already when he and Sellers got together to write it. Sellers told Country Weekly that he thought Robson's existing lyrics were "inspired", and thought that he would write a song with an "uplifting lyric". He said they intentionally did not define the song's character, so that the message could be applicable in various situations: "This could be something you'd say to someone in the family that's a soldier, fighting overseas… or to your mom, dad, wife or husband[…] I felt it could also be God saying it to someone."

Critical reception

Michael McCall of Associated Press praised the song in his review of the album, saying that it "show[ed] a new maturity" and "showcases Gary LeVox's tenor." Writing for The 9513, C.M. Wilcox gave the song a "thumbs up". He thought that the lyrics were vague but said that the song was "beautifully executed", also praising Gary LeVox's voice. Matt Bjorke of Roughstock gave it four stars out of five, saying, "this ‘power ballad’ showcases off the better parts of Gary LeVox’s singing style as he sings the melody of the lyric in a soft, tender tenor that is often the best pocket of his voice and while he does some vocal runs throughout the song, he sings this song in a tone that suits him the best." Ben Foster of "The 1-to-10 Country Music Review" gave it five stars out of ten, saying, "their performance is solid, and the harmonies are there, so "I Won't Let Go" is easy on the ears."

Music video
The music video was directed by Deaton-Flanigen Productions and premiered in early 2011. It is footage of a live performance.

Appearances in popular culture
In 2018, the World Wide Fund for Nature (WWF) use the song in a TV commercial focused on the plight of the Snow leopard.

Chart performance

Year-end charts

Certifications

References

2010 songs
2011 singles
Rascal Flatts songs
Big Machine Records singles
Country ballads
Music videos directed by Deaton-Flanigen Productions
Song recordings produced by Dann Huff
Songs written by Steve Robson
Songs written by Jason Sellers